Gulf Diabetes Specialist Center is a medical center located in Manama, Kingdom of Bahrain. It is primarily devoted to the treatment of diabetes and its related complications. It is an outpatient medical center that provides diabetes prevention programs and education and treatment for people with diabetes and their families. The facilities cover a range of functions including the management and treatment of adult and pediatric diabetes and metabolic disorders. The center was opened under the patronage of the Bahraini prime minister Khalifa Bin Salman Al Khalifa.

According to the medical director of GDSC, Bahrain's diabetes rate dropped in the year 2011 to 19.9%

Specialties
Diabetes, Endocrinology and Osteoporosis,
Neurology
Internal Medicine
Family Medicine

Scope of care

Adult Diabetes and Endocrine Disorders
Gestational Diabetes
Hypothyroidism and Hyperthyroidism/Graves’ disease
Thyroid gland nodules and malignancy
Parathyroid disorders
Pituitary gland disorders and pituitary tumors
Calcium disorders
Osteoporosis and Osteopenia
Foot Care
Vitamins deficiency
Lipids disorders
Hypertension
Obesity and weight disorders
Hypogonadism and Gynecomastia
Polycystic ovarian Syndrome
Hirsutism
Adrenal Glands disorders and tumors
Sexual Dysfunction

Special facilities
Radiology and Bone Densitometry
Laboratory
Podiatry
Pharmacy
Diabetes Education
Exercise Physiology (Gymnasium)

References

External links
Ministry of Health Bahrain
World Diabetes Foundation
WHO –diabetes programs
International Diabetes Federation

Diabetes organizations
Research institutes in Bahrain
Medical and health organisations based in Bahrain